Jan Stuifbergen (19 June 1929 – 8 December 2021) was a Dutch politician.

A member of the Catholic People's Party and later the Christian Democratic Appeal, he served as mayor of Bovenkarspel from 1965 to 1979, mayor of Grootebroek from 1967 to 1979, mayor of Stede Broec from 1979 to 1980, and mayor of Heerhugowaard from 1980 to 1994. Stuifbergen died on 8 December 2021, at the age of 92.

References

1929 births
2021 deaths
Mayors of places in the Netherlands
Catholic People's Party politicians
Christian Democratic Appeal politicians
People from Heiloo
People from Heerhugowaard
20th-century Dutch people
21st-century Dutch people